Lacinutrix algicola is a Gram-negative, aerobic and heterotrophic bacterium from the genus of Lacinutrix which has been isolated from a red alga.

References 

Flavobacteria
Bacteria described in 2008